Remler is a surname. Notable people with the surname include:

 Emily Remler (1957–1990), American jazz guitarist
 Philip Remler, American diplomat

See also
 Remmer
 Semler